Amber Kalirai is a fictional character from the British ITV soap opera Coronation Street, played by Nikki Patel, the character first appeared on-screen during the episode airing on 9 November 2005. In May 2011 it was announced that Patel had returned to filming and Amber appeared again from 11 July 2011. Patel made her final appearance as Amber on 23 March 2012.

Storylines
The character is the previously-unknown daughter of Dev Alahan (Jimmi Harkishin). She first appeared in November 2005, when her mum Ravinder was taken into hospital and she was looked after by her dad and his wife, Sunita Alahan on the Street. Amber started helping out in the Corner Shop but her incessant chat wound up Dev. Initially, Dev did not want Amber in his life as he was married to Sunita at the time and Amber served as a reminder of his philandering ways. However, he warmed to her and she came to live with him after her mother Ravinder moved to Finland with her partner. She had a crush on fellow neighbour David Platt (Jack P. Shepherd) but he was initially unaware of her feelings. When he did confront her, she denied it.

In early 2008, Amber began working at Valandros restaurant with Leanne Battersby (Jane Danson), Paul Clayton (Tom Hudson) and Luigi until it was set alight by Paul. Dev then claimed that he did not want her anywhere near Paul. Amber has an infatuation from David after he has been trying to make his ex-girlfriend Tina McIntyre (Michelle Keegan) jealous, first by letting Amber use one of his gig ticket which Tina had refused. In August 2008, David invited Amber around to his house for lunch in a deliberate attempt to annoy Tina. Amber, unaware that she was being used, kissed a less than enthusiastic David. Unable to contain her anger any longer, Tina stormed around to the house demanding to know why David was playing these games, this interruption left Amber humiliated. She breaks up with her boyfriend Darryl Morton (Jonathan Dixon) when she finds out he was going to leave her after her Dev paid him, although he changed his mind. She left Weatherfield to attend a university in London with her friend Mitch (Marcquelle Ward).

Mitch was a college friend of Amber who had been invited to a party along with Amber and Darryl in September 2009. Mitch met the couple in Victoria Street having booked a cab from StreetCars and excitedly told the pair that he could not wait to go to London as he would be able to purchase an Oyster card and use the underground instead of shelling out for taxis. Annoyed at finding out that he would be attending the same university as Amber, Darryl demands an explanation from her after instructing Mitch to go and double-check the booking, but as Amber brushed the matter aside and accused him of over-reacting, the pair argued and Darryl jumped to the conclusion that she fancied Mitch and refused to attend the party.

She returns nearly two years later to stay with Dev, much to his wife Sunita Alahan's (Shobna Gulati) reluctance. She soon starts catching up with old acquaintances such as David and Sean Tully (Antony Cotton) and helps Sophie Webster (Brooke Vincent) get her job back at her father's shop. She also reveals to Sophie that she was kicked out of university and gives Sophie tips on how to get back on Kevin Webster's (Michael Le Vell) good side. Amber then goes for a night out with Tommy Duckworth (Chris Fountain) and arrives home early next morning. Sunita agrees not to tell Dev about her staying out all night, but Sunita does tell Dev, and Amber reveals she has been kicked out of university. Tommy and Amber go on a date, but Tommy tells her he has to leave as his friend Tyrone Dobbs (Alan Halsall) is in hospital but he goes on a date with Tina, Amber walks in on them on a date and is furious. In October 2011, Amber takes Sophie to a lesbian bar, where Amber gets a girl's phone number but tells Sophie she will not be calling back as she is not a lesbian.

Then while Sophie's girlfriend, Sian Powers (Sacha Parkinson), is in France with her mother, Amber takes this as an opportunity to take Sophie out. She takes her to a bar where a boy chats up Sophie and as an act to "get the guy to leave her alone" Amber kisses Sophie and claims to be her girlfriend. Sophie, shocked asked Amber what she was playing at but was not too bothered as Amber had earlier spiked her drink. The next day Sophie calls in sick at Dev's corner shop feeling terrible after Amber spiking her drink and partly trying to avoid Amber. Sophie then consoles in Sunita of what to do and of guilt of developing feelings for Amber, Sophie then proposes to Sian and Sian accepts. Amber is over the moon when she receives a car from Dev for her 21st birthday.

Dev wants to take Sunita out for a meal and asks Amber to babysit, but says that she is going to a party. Dev refuses to cancel, so Sunita reluctantly agrees for a meal. However, when they came back, they saw Amber having an argument with Tyrone, Fiz Stape (Jennie McAlpine), Chesney Brown (Sam Aston) because she was having a party in the house. Sunita shouts at Amber, who threatens to leave the next day. Dev tries to reason with Amber, who says that she won't go if Sunita apologises. However, Sunita refuses to and Amber goes back to pack her bags. Amber tells Dev that she is staying at a friend's house. Amber gets a job in London and Dev stays with her for a few months after Sunita's affair with Karl Munro (John Michie) is exposed. Amber is unable to attend Sunita's funeral as she is travelling with her boyfriend.

Casting 
Nikki Patel was cast in the role. In May 2011 it was announced that Patel had returned to filming with the serial.

Amber is a streetwise and sassy character who is not afraid to speak her mind. ITV Publicity goes on to confirm this by describing the character of Amber as: "She is an intelligent, friendly, outgoing chatterbox who loves sharing gossip with Norris Cole. She’s sassy and streetwise too." What's on TV magazine describe Amber as: "Open and honest and always speaks her mind - even if it's uncomfortable hearing! She loves to gossip and is able to indulge her passion with equally nosy shopkeeper Norris."

Development
Amber later began dating Darryl Morton, which is her first real relationship, although the pair faced many obstacles within their first few weeks of dating. Darryl later moved in with Amber and her father Dev, after becoming homeless when his father Jerry rented 6 Coronation Street out to the Windass family. Due to his pairing with Amber, his character was given a reprieve so they could carry their on-screen romance after originally being axed with the rest of the Morton family.

The character of Amber became central to storylines during 2008 and Patel impressed bosses with her performance, and she was awarded with an onscreen relationship and friends; the first being Minnie Chandra who was portrayed by Poppy Jhakra. A spokesperson from the soap opera said: We've been extremely pleased with Nikki Patel's performance as Amber, so we thought it was about time to explore her friends on the Street. Minnie will play a part in the development of Amber's relationship with Daryl Morton and Dev's relationship with Tara."

Departure
On 19 February 2012, Colin Daniels of Digital Spy reported that Patel would be leaving the show. Daniels said the actress had already filmed her final scenes as Amber and she would make her last on-screen appearance the following month. Amber leaves Coronation Street following a series of rows with her stepmother, Sunita Alahan (Shobna Gulati). A show spokesperson said "Nikki will be leaving us at the end of her contract, but viewers may see Amber again."

Reception
In 2006 actress Nikki Patel was nominated as Best Newcomer at the National Television Awards. Ian Wylie on Manchester Evening News stated that Nikki Patel has shone in the portrayal of the determined school girl Amber and also went on to say that he thought she should have won an NTA for her portrayal of the character. Kate White from Inside Soap ran a feature on what Christmas presents she would give to soap characters. White said she would buy Amber a "big spoon" so she could stir up trouble for her neighbours. As White thought Amber did a great job of making Sophie and Sian's "terribly twee romance much more exciting".

References

External links

Coronation Street characters
Television characters introduced in 2005
Female characters in television
Fictional bisexual females
Fictional LGBT characters in television